Billy Reid (31 March 1938 – 20 July 2021) was a Scottish professional footballer who played as a wing half for Wishaw, before signing for Motherwell on his 17th birthday where he was part of the legendary Ancell Babes team. He then moved to Airdrieonians, before joining the Broomfield club's coaching staff. He also worked for Airdrieonians as a scout. His younger brother Sammy Reid also played for Motherwell.

References

1938 births
2021 deaths
Scottish footballers
Wishaw F.C. players
Motherwell F.C. players
Airdrieonians F.C. (1878) players
Scottish Football League players
Association football wing halves
Airdrieonians F.C. (1878) non-playing staff
Footballers from Motherwell